USS Passaic is a name used more than once by the U.S. Navy:

 , a single turreted, coastal monitor, built by Continental Iron Works, Greenpoint, Brooklyn, under subcontract from John Ericsson, was launched 30 August 1862; and commissioned 25 November 1862.
 USS Passaic (YT-20), was commissioned , 1 July 1911.
 , originally authorized as YN–1 13); redesignated AN–87 on 17 January 1944; laid down at Leathem D. Smith Shipbuilding Company, Sturgeon Bay, Wisconsin. 25 April 1944; launched 29 June 1944.

References 

United States Navy ship names